Anna Wilson-Jones (born 8 October 1970) is an English actress. She is known for her roles as Juliet Miller in the television series Hotel Babylon and main character Tim Bisley's ex-girlfriend Sarah in the series Spaced.

Acting career

In 1999, she appeared as Katie May in the six part mockumentary Boyz Unlimited
 
In 2000, she appeared as Sandra Harrison in the last episode of Inspector Morse, The Remorseful Day.

From 2004 to 2005, she was in the Sky One television series Hex, as Jo Watkins, and in 2006 the Channel 4 adaptation of the novel Sugar Rush, as Anna. She has also appeared in As If, Monarch of the Glen, Wonderful You, Waterloo Road, Rosemary & Thyme in 2003 in the episode The language of flowers and Ashes to Ashes.

Wilson-Jones has also featured in Midsomer Murders in 2013, the ITV parapsychology drama afterlife in which she plays Jude Bridge, the former wife of Robert Bridge (played by Andrew Lincoln) and from June 2007 she appeared as Sally in an ITV drama serial The Time of Your Life.
 
In 2009 she joined the cast of Hotel Babylon as Juliet Miller, hotel general manager.

In late 2011, she appeared in "The National Anthem", the first episode of the anthology series Black Mirror. She also stars in "The Night Watch" based on the novel by Sarah Waters released in 2012 for the BBC. She plays the character of Julia Standing, a lesbian writer, who lives in London during the Second World War. Wilson-Jones has also featured in Misfits as Laura, in season 2. Also in 2011, she played Rosalind Rydell in two episodes of the first season of DCI Banks, "Cold is the Grave: Part 1" and "Cold is the Grave: Part 2".

In 2016, Wilson-Jones joined the cast of the ITV drama Victoria, playing the part of Emma Portman, Viscountess Portman, one of Queen Victoria's ladies-in-waiting. She has been a regular in all three series to date. She also served as the narrator for the novel Victoria, written by the television series' creator, Daisy Goodwin.

On 9 January 2017, Jones appeared as Ellie Timpson in Silent Witness in the episode "Discovery". On 10 February 2018, Jones appeared as Linda Ashworth in Casualty.

She also played Davinia in Series 2 of the Channel 4 series PhoneShop.

Personal life
She is married to actor Steve John Shepherd.

Filmography

References

External links

1970 births
Living people
English television actresses
People educated at Sir William Perkins's School
People from Woking
Actresses from Surrey
20th-century English actresses
21st-century English actresses